The Turkestan Autonomy, or Kokand Autonomy, was a shortlived state in Central Asia that existed at the beginning of the Russian Civil War. It was formed on 27 November 1917 and existed until 22 February 1918. It was a secular republic, headed by a president.

It was one of the first secular states where the majority of the population were Muslims. It was the first democratic state in the history of Central Asia. The capital of the state was Kokand, which until then was the capital of the Kokand Khanate. There were 5 official languages: Uzbek, Kazakh, Kyrgyz, Tajik and Russian. The population was about 5 million people, mostly Uzbeks as well as Kazakhs, Kyrgyz, Tajiks, Russians and others.

History 
The Turkestan Autonomy occupied former territories of the Russian Empire, which was called the Turkestan Krai or the Russian Turkestan, more particular parts of the Semirechye, Syr-Darya and Fergana Oblasts (Provinces). From the north it bordered on the Alash Autonomy, from the east on the Republic of China, from the south on the Emirate of Afghanistan, from the south-west on the Emirate of Bukhara, on the west and north-west on the Soviet Central Asian Regions.

The government of Turkestan autonomy in January announced its intention to convene its parliament on 20 March 1918, on the basis of universal, direct, equal and secret ballot. Two-thirds of the seats in parliament were intended for Muslim deputies, and one-third was guaranteed to representatives of the non-Muslim population. The existence of such a parliament was to be the first step towards the democratization of Turkestan.

In January 1918, in response to an ultimatum from the Soviets on the voluntary inclusion into Soviet Russia, Mustafa Shokay refused to recognize the authority of the Soviets. For the destruction of the self-proclaimed Turkestan Autonomy, 11 trains with troops and artillery under the command of  arrived from Moscow in Tashkent. As a result of hostilities, thousands of civilians were killed.  Thus, the Turkestan autonomy was liquidated by the Bolsheviks only three months after its creation.  It was replaced by Turkestan Autonomous Soviet Socialist Republic.

In November 1917, Muhamedzhan Tynyshpaev was the first president of the state. The second and last president was Mustafa Shokay.

See also 
 Alash Autonomy

Notes

References

General references
 "Turkiston Muxtoriyati" entry in the National Encyclopedia of Uzbekistan. 

1917 establishments in Asia
1918 disestablishments in Asia
History of Uzbekistan
History of Kazakhstan
Post–Russian Empire states
Former countries in Central Asia
States and territories established in 1917